The Buka Island solomys (Solomys spriggsarum), also known as the Buka naked-tailed rat or Buka Island naked-tailed rat, is an extinct species of rodent known only from subfossil remains. This species occurred on Buka Island, the second largest island in the Papua New Guinean province of Bougainville.

References

Solomys
Holocene extinctions
Extinct rodents
Rodents of Oceania
Endemic fauna of Papua New Guinea
Extinct animals of Oceania
Mammals of Papua New Guinea
Buka, Papua New Guinea
Mammals described in 1990
Taxa named by Tim Flannery